North Korea, IOC designation: Democratic People's Republic of Korea, participated in the 2007 Asian Winter Games held in Changchun, China, from January 28, 2007, to February 4, 2007.

References

Nations at the 2007 Asian Winter Games
Asian Winter Games
North Korea at the Asian Winter Games